HKO may refer to:

 Hello Kitty Online, a video game
 Helsinki Philharmonic Orchestra
 Hong Kong Observatory
 Hankou railway station, China Railway pinyin code HKO